East Meadow Union Free School District (EMUFSD) is a school district headquartered in the Leon J. Campo Salisbury Center in Salisbury, New York.

The district was first established as the Common School District #3 in 1812, with a change in organization two years later.

The "Union Free" moniker identifies multiple primary schools feeding into a lesser number of high schools.  It has nothing to do with labor unions. The East Meadow Union Free School District teachers are part of the East Meadow Teachers Association which is affiliated with NYSUT, AFT, NEA, and AFL-CIO.

Schools
 High schools
 East Meadow High School
 W. T. Clarke High School

 Middle schools
 W.T. Clarke Middle School
 Woodland Middle School

 Elementary schools
 Barnum Woods
 Bowling Green School
 George McVey Elementary School
 Meadowbrook Elementary School
 Parkway Elementary School

References

External links
 East Meadow Union Free School District
 
School districts in New York (state)
1812 establishments in New York (state)
Education in Nassau County, New York